The Universe & Me is the sixth solo effort released by Tobin Sprout, it was released in 2017.

Track listing 
 Future Boy Today/Man Of Tomorrow - 2:47
 The Universe And Me - 3:47
 A Walk Across The Human Bridge - 2:30
 Manifest Street - 2:24
 Honor Guards - 1:56
 When I Was A Boy - 2:21
 Cowboy Curtains - 1:58
 Heavenly Bones - 2:15
 Heart Of Wax - 2:13
 I Fall You Fall - 4:03
 Tomorrow From Heaven - 3:47
 Just One Kid (Takes On The World) - 2:37
 To Wake Up June - 2:06
 Future Boy (Reprise) - 1:40

References 

2017 albums
Tobin Sprout albums